Crooked Colours are an Australian alternative dance group from Perth, Western Australia, who formed in 2013. The band consists of Phil Slabber, Leon Debaughn and Liam Merrett-Park.

Their album "Langata" peaked at number 1 on the Australian Dance Album ARIA Charts. The band started off as house party DJs, later developing into a three piece electronic live band.

Touring
Crooked Colours have performed at many festivals and events including: Groovin The Moo, Spilt Milk, Beyond The Valley, Falls Festival, Bonnaroo, and Splendour In The Grass.

Discography

Studio albums

Extended plays

Singles

Awards and nominations

AIR Awards
The Australian Independent Record Awards (known informally as the AIR Awards) are an annual series of awards which recognise, promote and celebrate the success of Australia's independent music sector. In 2018, Crooked Colours were nominated for one award,

|-
! scope="row"| 2018
| Vera 
| Best Independent Dance/Electronic Album
| 
|-

References

External links 
 
 

Australian electronic dance music groups
Musical groups from Perth, Western Australia
Musical groups established in 2013
2013 establishments in Australia